Vladimir Semyonovich Makanin (13 March 1937 in Orsk, Orenburg Oblast, RSFSR, Soviet Union – 1 November 2017 in , Aksaysky District, Rostov Oblast, Russia) was a Russian writer of novels and short stories

Life 
Makanin graduated from the Faculty of Mechanics and Mathematics at Moscow State University and worked as a teacher in the Military Academy until the early 1960s. In 1963 he took the High Courses for Scriptwriters and Film Directors at the Gerasimov Institute of Cinematography, then worked for the publishing house Sovietskiy Pisatel (The Soviet Writer).

He published his first book in 1965. In 1985, he became a board member at the Union of Soviet Writers and, two years later, joined the editorial staff at Znamya. He spent most of his later years in Krasny, near Rostov-on-Don. In 2007, he headed the jury for the Big Book award. The following year, he was the recipient.

Makanin's writing style may be categorized as realist. His forte lies in depicting the psychological impact of everyday life experiences.

English translations
Antileader, from The New Soviet Fiction, Abbeville Press, NY, 1989.
Baize-covered Table with Decanter, Readers International, 1995.
Escape Hatch, and The Long Road Ahead, Ardis Publishers, 1996.
The Loss, Northwestern University Press, 1998.

Selected bibliography
 Straight line,  1965
 Blue and Red  (Голубое и красное),   1975
 The Portrait and Around (Портрет и вокруг),  1978
 Antileader  (Антилидер),    1980
 Ancestor (Предтеча),  1982
 He and She  (Один и одна),   1987
 The Underground, or a Hero of Our Time  (Андерграунд, или Герой нашего времени),   1999
 Asan  (Acaн),   2008

Awards 
 1984 Order of the Badge of Honour
 1993 Russian Booker Prize for Baize-covered Table with Decanter
 1998 Pushkin Prize for his oeuvre
 1999 State Prize of the Russian Federation
 2001 Italian Premio Penne
 2008 Big Book Award for Asan
 2012 European Prize for Literature

References 

1937 births
2017 deaths
Russian male novelists
Soviet novelists
Soviet male writers
20th-century Russian male writers
Russian male short story writers
Soviet short story writers
20th-century Russian short story writers
State Prize of the Russian Federation laureates
Pushkin Prize winners
Moscow State University alumni
High Courses for Scriptwriters and Film Directors alumni
Russian mathematicians
Soviet mathematicians
Russian Booker Prize winners
People from Orsk